Ruby, Don't Take Your Love to Town is the fourth album by American rock band The First Edition. This was the first album to credit the group as Kenny Rogers & The First Edition.  The title song reached number 6 on the Billboard Hot 100 chart in the United States (and was a success mirrored world-wide). "Reuben James" became a top-30 hit in 1969 for The First Edition before also being recorded by Conway Twitty for his 1970 Hello Darlin'  album.

Track listing
"Ruby, Don't Take Your Love to Town" (Mel Tillis)
"Me and Bobby McGee" (Kris Kristofferson)
"New Design" (P.F. Sloan)
"Always Leaving, Always Gone" (Dick Monda)
"Listen To The Music" (Barry Mann, Cynthia Weil)
"Sunshine" (Mickey Newbury)
"Once Again She's All Alone" (Mike Settle)
"Girl Get a Hold of Yourself" (Kenny Rogers)
"Good Time Liberator" (Kenny Rogers, Mike Settle)
"Reuben James" (Alex Harvey, Barry Etris)

Personnel
Kenny Rogers - Bass guitar, vocals
Mike Settle - Rhythm guitar, vocals
Thelma Camacho - background vocals
Mary Arnold - backing vocals
Terry Williams - lead guitar
Mickey Jones - drums

References

1969 albums
Kenny Rogers and The First Edition albums
Albums produced by Jimmy Bowen
Albums produced by Mike Post
Reprise Records albums